Bolivaridia is a genus of proturans in the family Acerentomidae.

Species
 Bolivaridia boneti Tuxen, 1976
 Bolivaridia imadatei Prabhoo, 1975
 Bolivaridia perissochaeta Bonet, 1942
 Bolivaridia somalicum Yin & Dallai, 1985

References

Protura